Two ships of the United States Navy have borne the name USS Hart. The first Hart was named for Midshipman Ezekiel Hart, who died in the War of 1812, and Lieutenant Commander John E. Hart, who died in the Civil War. The second Hart was named for Lieutenant Patrick H. Hart (1915–1942), who died in the Battle of Midway.

United States Navy ship names